The People's Democratic Movement may refer to:

People's Democratic Movement (Chile)
People's Democratic Movement (Dominica)
People's Democratic Movement (Grenada)
People's Democratic Movement (Guyana)
People's Democratic Movement (Meghalaya)
People's Democratic Movement (Montserrat)
People's Democratic Movement (Papua New Guinea)
People's Democratic Movement (Turks and Caicos Islands)